Now You See Me, Now You Don't may refer to:

 "Now You See Me, Now You Don't" (Pee-wee's Playhouse), a 1986 episode of Pee-wee's Playhouse
 "(Now You See Me) Now You Don't", a song on  Lee Ann Womack's 1998 album Some Things I Know
 Now You See Me, Now You Don't (album), a 1982 album by Cliff Richard and title-track of the album
 "Now You See Me, Now You Don't", a 2008 episode of America's Next Top Model, Cycle 11
 "Now You See Me, Now You Don't", a 2013 episode in the fourth season of Pretty Little Liars
 Now You See Me, Now You Don't, a 1975 education film by Densey Clyne
 Now You See Me, Now You Don't, a 1994 film with Anthony Wong

See also 
 Now You See Him, Now You Don't, a 1972 Disney film and sequel to The Computer Wore Tennis Shoes
 Now You See Me (film), a 2013 American heist film
 Now You See Me 2, a 2016 American caper thriller film and sequel to the 2013 film Now You See Me
 Now You See Me (disambiguation)
 Now You See It, Now You Don't (disambiguation)
 Now You See It (disambiguation)